René Chanas, real name René Lindecker (13 September 1913 - 9 July 1990) was a French film director, screenwriter, and film producer.

Filmography

Director 
 1945: The Last Judgment
 1946: 
 1948: 
 1948: 
 1949: 
 1951:  (film with two versions)
 1951 :  (film with two versions)
 1952: Alone in the World
 1953: 
 1954:

Screenwriter 
 1947: La Taverne du poisson couronné 
 1948: Le Colonel Durand
 1951: Un sourire dans la tempête
 1953: Je suis un mouchard
 1954: La Patrouille des sables (film with two versions)
 1954:  (film with two versions)

Producer 
 1950: Un sourire dans la tempête (Line producer)	
 1951: Ein Lächeln im Sturm (producer)

External links 
  
 René Chanas on Les gens du cinéma.com
 11 films liés à René Chanas on Ciné-Ressources.net
 Les films de René Chanas on Unifrance.org
 René Chanas on BNF database

20th-century French screenwriters
French film producers
Film directors from Paris
1913 births
1990 deaths